Eamonn Butler (born 1953) is a British economist. He is the co-founder and director of the Adam Smith Institute.

Early life
Eamonn Butler was born in 1953. His brother is Stuart Butler. He graduated from the University of St Andrews. and also studied at the University of Aberdeen.

Career
Butler worked on pensions and welfare issues for the United States House of Representatives in Washington DC, before returning to the UK where he served as editor of the British Insurance Broker Monthly.

He co-founded the Adam Smith Institute in London with his brother Stuart and Madsen Pirie, both graduates from the University of St Andrews. He now serves as its Director.

He is author of books on the work of three economists: Hayek: His Contribution to the Economic and Political Thought of Our Time; Milton Friedman: A Guide to his Economic Thought; Ludwig von Mises: A Primer; Ludwig von Mises: Fountainhead of the Modern Microeconomics Revolution. Additionally, he has contributed extensively to national magazines and newspapers such as The Times on subjects ranging from health policy, economic management, taxation and public spending, transport, pensions, and e-government.

He served as the Secretary on the 2012–14 Board of Directors of the Mont Pelerin Society.

He received an Honorary Doctorate from Heriot-Watt University in 2012.

Bibliography
Ayn Rand: An Introduction, 2018
The Condensed Wealth of Nations, Eamonn Butler, 2011
Milton Friedman: A Concise Guide to the Ideas and Influence of the Free-Market Economist, Eamonn Butler, 2011
Austrian Economics: A Primer, Eamonn Butler, 2010
Ludwig Von Mises: A Primer, Eamonn Butler, 2010
The Alternative Manifesto, Eamonn Butler, 2010
Hayek: His Contribution to the Political and Economic Thought of Our Time, Eamonn Butler & Jeff Riggenbach, 2010 (Audiobook)
Ludwig Von Mises: Fountainhead of the Modern Microeconomics Revolution, Eamonn Butler & Jeff Riggenbach, 2010 (Audiobook)
The Rotten State of Britain, Eamonn Butler, 2009
The Best Book on the Market, Eamonn Butler, 2008
Adam Smith - A Primer, Eamonn Butler, 2007
The Future of the NHS, Eamonn Butler, 2006 
Simply No Mistake: How the Stakeholder Pension Must Work, Eamonn Butler, 1998
The Great Escape: Financing the Transition to Funded Welfare, Eamonn Butler, 1997
Fortune Account, Eamonn Butler & Madsen Pirie, 1995
The End of the Welfare State, Eamonn Butler & Madsen Pirie, 1994
Taming the Trade Unions, Eamonn Butler, 1991
Ludwig Von Mises: Fountainhead of the Modern Microeconomic Revolution, Eamonn Butler, 1988
The Health Alternatives, Eamonn Butler & Madsen Pirie, 1988
Good Health: Role of Health Maintenance Organizations, Eamonn Butler, 1986
Milton Friedman: A Guide to His Economic Thought, Eamonn Butler, 1985
Hayek, Eamonn Butler, 1985
Aid by Enterprise, Eamonn Butler & Madsen Pirie, 1984
Free Ports, Eamonn Butler & Madsen Pirie, 1983
Private Road Ahead, Eamonn Butler & Gabriel Roth, 1982
Economy and Local Government, Eamonn Butler & Madsen Pirie, 1981
Forty Centuries of Wage and Price Controls, Eamonn Butler & Robert Schuettinger, 1979

References

External links
 Eamonn Butler website

1953 births
Living people
People from London
Alumni of the University of St Andrews
British economists